Isio Wanogho (born November 17, 1983) is a Nigerian supermodel, columnist, painter, and Interior architect. She received an African Youth Society award, two Future Awards nominations, FAB award, a Nigerian Model Achievers Award and was named the youth ambassador by the Global Foundation for Peace, Unity, and Development. She has pursued several endeavors including: making graphic art consisting of hand-made cards in year 2000, modelling in 2002, television presenter in 2007, fashion design in 2009 (after which she debuted 5000 outfits as one of three official designers for the Lagos Carnival in 2010).

Biography 
Nigerian born Isio lived and schooled in Florence, Italy where she earned an M.Sc in Interior Design. When she moved back to Nigeria in 2012, she set up her design studio and continued her work as a TV presenter. She is conversant in six languages, but speaks only English, Yoruba, Italian and the indigenous “Broken English” proficiently.

Wanogho was sent to the Mayflower School in Ikenne when she was five years old. She completed her primary and secondary education there and was an active member of its sports, literary and dance societies - Participating in debates and competitions within the school and for the school against other schools in Ogun State. After graduating high school, Wanogho spent two years at home studying to gain admission into College. She spent her spare time drawing, painting and writing poetry before finding the courage to share with her family that she had always wanted to pursue her dream of becoming a fashion-model.

Modelling 
But after being scouted on her way home from private lessons by model-scout Otu Winpana, she told her family who were initially not enthusiastic about the idea but eventually turned around. Later that year, Wanogho contested in the 2002 QueenAfrik beauty pageant with the support of her mother. Winpana chaperoned her but Wanogho neither won nor came out as a finalist. Wanogho's big break came when she was chosen to model for designer DAVIDA at the 2002 St. Moritz Style Selection - the biggest fashion show in Nigeria at the time. Over the next few years as a run-way model she modelled for the biggest Nigerian designers and became the muse for Davida, Remi Lagos and HALLERO. In 2015, Wanogho was unveiled as The Campaign Ambassador for DIESEL in Nigeria and the face of DIESEL@Centro in Nigeria.

Television presenting 
Isio ventured into the world of broadcasting and communications in 2006 when she was featured as a guest presenter on The Nigerian International show which aired across Nigeria and the UK. In 2007, she worked alongside Uche Agbai and IK Ikponwosa as the media face for Close Up in the Close Up Salsa Fresh Challenge where she featured as a TV presenter and spokesmodel, hosting media and press conferences on behalf of the brand to the press, as well as touring several states of the country, to sensitise Nigerians to the objectives of the brand and the project.

In 2009, Isio ventured full-time into TV presenting as the head presenter for Soundcity's affiliate Fashion Station: Spice TV and rebranded, taking the De-laVega pseudonym . As head of her department, Isio hosted 6 shows ranging from lifestyle to fashion, to round-table discussions and live interviews. This gained her a wider fan base and launched her into Globacom's music and lifestyle TV show as the female presenter alongside IllRymz.
Three years later, IDDS was born (Isio De-laVega Design Studios). Merging functionality, aesthetics and style, the design firm services commercial and residential spaces  In this she has been recognized and honored with multiple awards and nominations, amongst which are the 2010 FAB Award as Best Presenter, 2010 African Youth Society Role Model Award, 2010 NMAA best Model-Presenter.

In 2014, she made her debut appearance on the silver screen as an actress on NdaniTv's Gidi Up as Bibi. Few months later, she featured as the leading lady in Ikechukwu ‘Killz’ Onanaku's short film; Badt Guy.

Television shows 
 2006 - Guest Presenter | Nigerian International 
 2007- CloseUp Fresh Challenge Latin Dance Reality Show 
 2008-2010 - SpiceTV Head Presenter/CoProducer | SoundCity All Access – RedCarpet Show Urban Spice – Travel and Tourism Show Bargain Hunters- Daily deals I got a date – Matchmaking Show Women's Table – A discussion about women and sensitive topics 
 2010-2011 - G-bam Globacom TV Show Music, lifestyle entertainment show with live audience 
 2011- Fashion TV Fashion Party and first FTV event in Nigeria 2012 - Fabulous TV Guest Presenter Entertainment Magazine Show 
 2013 - Glamsquad Guest Presenter Fashion Police, Comedy, Celebrity Critique

Isio De-laVega Design Studios 
After her return from Florence, Italy, Wanogho set up a design studio (Isio De-laVega Design Studios) which offered bespoke design services for both domestic and commercial customers.

Charitable works 
Wanogho contributes to the less-privileged and the sick by giving a monthly allowance of her earnings to orphanages and anonymously paying the medical bills of the sick. Her outlook towards suffering, illnesses and hunger is fueled by her parents’ teachings of empathy and appreciation, and by many years spent in Mayflower School, a boarding school far away from the home of her childhood. She saw first-hand there the devastating physical, emotional and psychological effects of neglect, discrimination, suffering and lack.

She mentors young models through Celebrite Modelling School and its annual program The Model Workshop, and has a mentorship page with Mara Mentors online platform.

Painting 
In 2008, Wanogho acquired a B.A in Painting and Sculpture from at the University of Lagos. To perfect her craft, she was mentored by Nigerian Impressionist Master- Edosa Ogiugo. As an artist, her Urhobo tribal heritage is a huge influence on her art, being from the Niger-Delta region of Nigeria, from the Urhobo tribe.

From a young age Wanogho had always been drawn to creative expression through art, namely drawing, singing and writing plays and short stories. She has exhibited her art/design in Florence, Italy, in Lagos and in Port Harcourt at the Total E&P (TEPNG) 2013 arts exhibition. In 2014, she contributed to the International Art Festival. Art is a gift Wanogho believes she was born with.

Writing  
In January, 2014 Isio began publishing her writings through a weekly column in BellaNaija magazine, called Isio Knows Better. In this she combines wit, satire and personal experiences to draw out the audience to confront serious issues, social relationships and conflicts that are often thought about but rarely spoken about or acted upon in the Nigerian society.

In 2015, the Isio Knows Better column became so popular, that Wanogho was severely petitioned via social media by fans to resume writing after she took a six-week break from writing.

Education 
MSc Interior Architecture-Design (2011). FLORENCE DESIGN ACADEMY

Awards and nominations 
2014 - Model of the year – Lagos fashion awards
2013 - Youth ambassador- Global foundation for peace, unity, development.
2012 - Celebrity ambassador - Lagos anti rape campaign.
2011 - African youth society - Honorary achievement award and African role model
2010 - FAB International magazine - Model of the year.
2010 - Nigerian model achievers award - Best TV presenter.
2009 - Future Awards - model of the year finalist.
2010 - The Future Awards nominee - TV presenter of the year.
2009 - Exquisite magazine finalist - female TV presenter of the year.

See also
Ambrose Olutayo Somide

References

Nigerian female models
Nigerian television personalities
Urhobo people
University of Lagos alumni
Nigerian television presenters
Nigerian interior designers
Mayflower School alumni
1983 births
Living people
Nigerian women television presenters